"They Say" is the first single by alternative rock band Scars on Broadway. The song was made available on both the band’s official MySpace and their official site on March 28, 2008.

The song was made available for download on the video game Rock Band on July 29, 2008, the same day of the album’s release  and is a playable track on the video game Guitar Hero 5. It is also in the racing game, Colin McRae: Dirt 2.

Track listing
All songs written by Malakian.

Digital Download

Vinyl

Music video
On June 20, 2008, Scars on Broadway released a music video teaser for "They Say" on a MySpace bulletin and blog.
In the teaser, the video is said to premiere soon. The official music video premiered on the Yahoo! Music page on June 27.

The video was directed by Paul Minor.  It shows the band playing in a studio of some kind, and flashes clips of world event such as protests intermittently.

The video, that was on YouTube and had amassed over 6.2 million views, is now blocked in a lot of countries across the world. The reasons for this are currently unknown.

Charts

References

2008 singles
2008 songs
Songs written by Daron Malakian
Interscope Records singles
Daron Malakian and Scars on Broadway songs